85 (eighty-five) is the natural number following 84 and preceding 86.

In mathematics
85 is:

 the product of two prime numbers (5 and 17), and is therefore a semiprime; specifically, the 24th biprime not counting perfect squares.  Together with 86 and 87, it forms the second cluster of three consecutive biprimes.
 an octahedral number.
 a centered triangular number.
 a centered square number.
 a decagonal number.
 the smallest number that can be expressed as a sum of two squares, with all squares greater than 1, in two ways, 85 = 92 + 22 = 72 + 62.
 the length of the hypotenuse of four Pythagorean triangles.
 a Smith number in decimal.

In astronomy
 Messier object M85 is a magnitude 10.5 lenticular galaxy in the constellation Coma Berenices
 NGC 85 is a galaxy in the constellation Andromeda
 85 Io is a large main belt asteroid
 85 Pegasi is a multiple star system in constellation of Pegasus
 85 Ceti is a variable star in the constellation of Cetus
 85D/Boethin is a periodic comet

In titles and names
 Federalist No. 85, by Alexander Hamilton, the last of The Federalist Papers (1788)
 The 85 Ways to Tie a Tie, a book by Thomas Fink and Yong Mao
 85 Days: The Last Campaign of Robert Kennedy a book by Jules Witcover
 Live/1975–85, an album of live recordings by Bruce Springsteen (1986)
 80–85 a compilation album by Bad Religion (1991)
 Cupid & Psyche 85, an album by band Scritti Politti (1985)
 45/85 was a television documentary on World War II
 Minuscule 85, Papyrus 85, Lectionary 85 are early Greek manuscripts of the New Testament
 "85", a 2000 rap single by YoungBloodz, from their album Against Da Grain
 85°C, a Taiwanese coffee store chain.

In sports
In U.S. college athletics, schools that are members of NCAA Division I are limited to providing athletic scholarships to a maximum of 85 football players in a given season. The specifics vary by the two Division I football subdivisions:
 In the top-level FBS, each player provided with a scholarship may, and almost always does, receive a full scholarship.
 In the second-level FCS, schools are allowed to provide football-related athletic aid equivalent to 63 full scholarships, but this aid may be divided among up to 85 players as the schools see fit.

In other fields

 The year AD 85, 85 BC, or 1985.
 The Muslim calendar year 85 AH.
 The atomic number of the chemical element astatine
 The number of the French department Vendée
 The ISBN Group Identifier for books published in Brazil
 The radix of the Ascii85 (sometimes called Base85) binary-to-text encoding
 The IQ and nickname of Aaron in Alien 3
 The number worn by Chad Ochocinco, whose name means "eight five" in Spanish
 Arabigere 85 is a village in India
 E85 fuel is 85% ethanol and 15% conventional gasoline
 MCS-85 was a family of Intel processors including the 8085
 TI-85 was a graphing pocket calculator by Texas Instruments
 KC 85 was a family of small computers built in East Germany in the 1980s
 PMD 85 was a personal computer built in Czechoslovakia in 1985
 Learjet 85 is an all-composite plane being developed by Bombardier Aerospace
 British Rail Class 85, a category of UK train locomotives
 DRG Class 85, a category of German train locomotives
 TK85 was a clone of the Sinclair ZX81 made in Brazil in 1983
 Lima Site 85 was a battle in the Vietnam War
 A85 is the Dutch Defence in the Encyclopaedia of Chess
 EF 85mm is a photographic camera lens by Canon
 F85 (disambiguation), multiple uses
 Part of the assignation for the Toyota AE85, commonly referred to as an "eight-five".

In military technology
 85mm is a common caliber for cannons
 SU-85 was a Soviet tank
 TR-85 was a Romanian battle tank
 Tu-85 was a prototype Soviet bomber
 ASU-85 a Soviet self-propelled gun
 CZ 85 is a Czech 9mm semiautomatic pistol
 PT-85 is a Korean tank
 7.62 Tkiv 85 is a Finnish army rifle
 HG 85 is a Swiss fragmentation grenade
 Taurus Model 85, a 9mm revolver made in Brazil

See also
 List of highways numbered 85
 List of highways numbered 85A
 Type 85 submachine gun

References

External links

 85
 Jorge Stolfi, The Hollywood Constant.

Integers